Landquart District is a former administrative district in the canton of Graubünden, Switzerland. It was replaced with the Landquart Region on 1 January 2017 as part of a reorganization of the Canton.

It consisted of two Kreise (circles) and nine municipalities:

In 2008 the municipality of Says merged into Trimmis.  In 2012, the municipalities of Igis and Mastrils merged to form the new municipality of Landquart.

The district was formerly called Unterlandquart and additionally included the sub-districts of Schiers and Seewis, now part of Prättigau/Davos.

Languages

References

Districts of Graubünden